James  Brainard is the mayor of Carmel, Indiana, a principal city in the Indianapolis metropolitan area. Brainard, who first took office January 1, 1996, is currently serving his seventh consecutive four-year term, most recently reelected in 2019. Mayor Brainard is one of Indiana's longest serving mayors. While mayor, Carmel's population has grown from 25,000 in 1996 to 102,000 in 2021 and seen the creation of a new downtown called City Center, where a new 1,600-seat concert hall, The Palladium at the Center for the Performing Arts, opened in 2011. Two smaller theaters have opened as well, in addition to the redevelopment of the oldest part of town into a new Arts & Design District.

Early life and education
James Brainard was raised in Bristol, Indiana, the son of Jack and Dortha Brainard. Brainard attended Butler University, studying history, political science and speech. After graduating from Butler with a Bachelor of Arts in 1976, he entered the Claude W. Pettit College of Law at Ohio Northern University. He earned a Juris Doctor in Law from Ohio Northern University in 1982.

Political views

Transportation policy
Brainard is frequently asked to speak about city planning, redevelopment and roadway networks. Under his administration, the City of Carmel has eliminated dozens of traffic signals and dangerous intersections, replacing them with roundabouts. Carmel, with 142 roundabouts as of January 2022, has more roundabouts than any other city in the United States. The policy has been credited with a reduction of both carbon emissions, fatalities and intersection collisions.

He arranged to construct the first roundabout in the city at the corner of River Road and Main Street in 1996 followed in 1997 by building two roundabouts on the newly built Hazel Dell Parkway at 126th and Main Streets.

Climate and energy
Brainard is described as a moderate Republican who has earned a reputation for defending efforts to fight against the effects of global warming. Brainard is serving as a Trustee and co-chair of the Energy Independence and Climate Protection Task Force for the U.S. Conference of Mayors. In November 2013 he was appointed to the Task Force on Climate Preparedness and Resilience by the President of the United States. He traveled in 2015 to four cities in India to represent the United States as part of the US State Department's speaker's bureau. Also, in 2015 he was asked to speak on energy and climate policy at the German-American Centers in five German cities. He has been a guest lecturer for Georgetown University, Butler University, Indiana University and Purdue University among others. Because of his views, Brainard was selected to be on President Obama's Task Force on Climate Preparedness and Resilience.  In 2013, it was announced he would be "one of 26 local government representatives who make up a new task force to help communities deal with the effects of climate change."

Fiscal and health policy
Brainard is also a fiscal conservative who has invested millions of dollars in local redevelopment projects while keeping the city tax rate among the lowest among cities in the state of Indiana. Because of Brainard's activity to create a health-conscious community, Carmel has received various awards for its healthy living. 

Concerns have been raised in recent years about Brainard's handling of Carmel city finances. In 2015 the city overestimated tax revenues by over $5 million and was forced to reallocate funds between accounts to meet then current obligations. In 2017 S&P downgraded Carmel's long-term bond rating from AA-plus to AA, noting a $300 million increase in debt over the prior 3 years. In its analysis, S&P noted "In our view, this demonstrates the risk of high leverage and a heavy dependence on sometimes more volatile tax-increment revenues. We feel the city's crowded budget and high fixed costs leave it vulnerable to unanticipated economic or operational swings."

In response to a question about the Green New Deal, Brainard has said, "I think we have [to] find that middle ground where we can do things that encourage green jobs—do things that help the economy and reduce carbon at the same time."

Civil rights and diversity
In 2015, he proposed and the City Council passed a new ordinance designed to protect human rights regardless of race, religion, sexual orientation, or gender identity. The issue was first raised in Carmel during the election campaign and came to its closure during a time of heightened awareness. Brainard is a supporter of diversity in Carmel. He hosts an annual Iftar dinner for the local Muslim community and established a new Carmel Interfaith Alliance in the fall of 2015 designed to bring together pastors and religious leaders from a variety of faiths. Brainard has said, "Carmel's diversity brings a richness to the fabric of our community, and our freedom of religion should be celebrated."

Awards
2013 International Making Cities Livable Joseph P. Riley Jr. Award "for his inspirational leadership in creating a vibrant, multi-functional heart for Carmel, IN."
2012 American Council of Engineering Companies of Indiana (ACEC Indiana) Public Service Award 
2011 Local Arts Leadership award for the "Support the Arts fund, which mandates that one percent of the city's general fund support local arts organizations."

References

Mayors of places in Indiana
Butler University alumni
Claude W. Pettit College of Law alumni
People from Bristol, Indiana
1954 births
Indiana Republicans
Living people